Following is a list of notable music venues in Portland, Oregon:

 Aladdin Theater
 Alberta Street Pub
 Antoinette Hatfield Hall
 Arlene Schnitzer Concert Hall
 Crystal Ballroom
 Dante's
 Doug Fir Lounge
 Hawthorne Theatre
 Holocene
 Jack London Revue
 Keller Auditorium
 Lola's Room
 Mississippi Studios
 Moda Center
 Oregon Zoo
 Revolution Hall
 Roseland Theater
 Spare Room Restaurant and Lounge
 Star Theater
 Veterans Memorial Coliseum
 Wonder Ballroom
 World Famous Kenton Club

Defunct venues include:

 Analog Café and Theater
 Backspace
 Berbati's Pan
 Blue Monk
 Brasserie Montmartre
 Candlelight Cafe & Bar
 The Dude Ranch
 Jimmy Mak's
 The Know
 La Luna
 The Liquor Store
 No Vacancy Lounge
 Paris Theatre
 Satyricon
 Tonic Lounge
 X-Ray Cafe

See also
 Portland's Centers for the Arts

Portland, Oregon
 
Music venues